"Tennessee Homesick Blues" is a song written and recorded by American entertainer Dolly Parton that was featured in the soundtrack of the 1984 movie Rhinestone. It was released in May 1984 as the lead single from the film's soundtrack, it topped the U.S. country singles charts on September 8, 1984, as well as on the Canadian country singles charts. It also earned Parton her 10th overall nomination for the Grammy Award for Best Country Vocal Performance, Female.

Content
A reminiscence of Parton's rural Tennessee upbringing, the song was similar in theme to some of her earlier compositions, including "My Tennessee Mountain Home", though in this case, the song found its protagonist (like the character Parton played in the film) stranded in New York City and reminiscing about the Great Smoky Mountains in rural Tennessee.

Charts

Weekly charts

Year-end charts

References

External links
Tennessee Homesick Blues lyrics at Dolly Parton On-Line

1984 singles
Dolly Parton songs
Songs written by Dolly Parton
RCA Records singles
Songs about Tennessee
1984 songs
Songs written for films